East Northport is a hamlet and census-designated place (CDP) in the town of Huntington in Suffolk County, New York, United States. The population was 20,217 at the 2010 census.

History

Founding
Soon after the establishment of a village in the Huntington area, English settlers sought to further expand their territory.  On July 30, 1656, land was purchased from Chief Asharoken, head of the Matinecocks Native American tribe, part of which consisted of the land that is today known as East Northport.

Larkfield and Clay Pitts
Two distinct communities formed in the area now known as East Northport. The more populous settlement known as Larkfield was located on the northern side, near Vernon Valley (now part of Northport). Larkfield originally developed near the location of Genola Cemetery, just north of the modern-day junction of Larkfield Road, Vernon Valley Road, and Laurel Road. A second community located on the southern side was known as Clay Pitts, named for its vast deposits of red clay. This clay which had been used by Native Americans to form pottery was used by the Europeans to form bricks for construction.  The land between Larkfield and Clay Pitts was well suited for agriculture, and the region prospered in the late 18th century as a thriving farming community by supplying produce to markets in New York City and Brooklyn.

East Northport
In 1868 the Long Island Rail Road opened a station within the village of Northport. However, just a few years later the LIRR decided to move the Northport station to a new location in Larkfield to facilitate further railway extension to Port Jefferson. The new railway station located at Larkfield Road and Bellerose Avenue opened on January 13, 1873. Although the station retained the name of Northport, train conductors would refer to it as "East of Northport", because the station was located east of the railway junction which used to direct trains north to the old station located in the village of Northport. Despite the fact that East Northport is primarily south of Northport, the area became known thereafter as East Northport. The Larkfield Post Office formally changed its name to East Northport in 1910. The East Northport, New York post office building was renamed the Jerome Anthony Ambro, Jr. Post Office Building in 1998.

Suburban growth
As Americans returned home from World War II, Long Island experienced a dramatic population shift from large cities to suburban areas. East Northport's population soared as a housing boom transformed the rural farmland into modern suburbs. Today East Northport is the largest community in the town of Huntington, by land area, and third in population behind Huntington Station and Dix Hills.

Crime
On August 11, 1989, FBI Informant Robert Kubecka and his brother-in-law Donald Barstow were murdered inside their Brightside Avenue office by Lucchese Family soldiers Rocco Vitulli and Frank "Frankie the Pearl" Federico, on orders of Capo Salvatore Avellino, with the blessing of then-Lucchesse underboss Anthony 'Gaspipe' Casso. Information provided by Kubecka had been used as part of the infamous Mafia Commission Trial in 1985-1986.

Geography
East Northport is located at  (40.879248, -73.324133).

Demographics

Demographics for the CDP
As of the census of 2010, there were 20,217 people, 7,114 households, and 5,467 families residing in the CDP. The population density was 3,887.9 per square mile (1,508.7/km2). There were 7,288 housing units at an average density of 1401.5/sq mi (543.9/km2). The racial makeup of the CDP was 93.1% White, 0.8% African American, 0.05% Native American, 2.8% Asian, 0.05% Pacific Islander, 1.7% some other race, and 1.4% from two or more races. Hispanic or Latino of any race were 6.7% of the population.

There were 7,114 households, out of which 39.0% had children under the age of 18 living with them, 62.9% were headed by married couples living together, 10.1% had a female householder with no husband present, and 23.2% were non-families. 18.8% of all households were made up of individuals, and 9.1% were someone living alone who was 65 years of age or older. The average household size was 2.84, and the average family size was 3.22.

In the CDP, the population was spread out, with 25.5% under the age of 18, 6.3% from 18 to 24, 23.8% from 25 to 44, 30.4% from 45 to 64, and 13.9% who were 65 years of age or older. The median age was 41.8 years. For every 100 females, there were 97.8 males. For every 100 females age 18 and over, there were 93.7 males.

For the period 2009–2011 the annual median income for a household in the CDP was an estimated $101,058. Males had a median income of $81,472 versus $55,403 for females. The per capita income for the CDP was $39,766. About 1.5% of families and 3.2% of the population were below the poverty line, including 2.4% of those under age 18 and 8.3% of those age 65 or over.

Schools 
Students residing in East Northport attend the Northport-East Northport Union Free School District.  East Northport USPS serves both parts of Commack and Elwood, leading some individuals to erroneously believe they are East Northport residents.  Commack residents with East Northport postal addresses attend Commack School District and Elwood residents with East Northport postal addresses attend Elwood School District.  A few students also attend the Half Hollow Hills Central School District. The following schools are located within East Northport or have an East Northport mailing address:

Public schools 
 East Northport Middle School
 Fifth Avenue Elementary School
 Pulaski Road School
 Northport High School

Private/religious schools 
 St. Paul's Lutheran School (Lutheran K-5)
 Trinity Regional School (Catholic K-8)

Notable people
 Robert John Burke, actor
 John Scurti, actor
 Joseph "Joe C". Caridi, current consigliere of the Lucchese crime family
 Eugene Gearty, Academy Award winner for Sound
 Joseph Jesselli, luthier and guitar craftsman
 Ashley Massaro, former World Wrestling Entertainment (WWE) diva
 Steve Park, NASCAR driver
 Andrew Lichtenberger, poker player
 Anthony Cumia, Talk Show host (Opie & Anthony)

External links
 East Northport Chamber of Commerce

References

Huntington, New York
Census-designated places in New York (state)
Census-designated places in Suffolk County, New York